The 2019 Football Championship of Khmelnytskyi Oblast was won by Epitsentr Dunayivtsi.

League table

 SC Khmelnytskyi played in the 2018–19 Ukrainian Football Amateur League.
 FC Epitsentr Dunayivtsi played in the 2019–20 Ukrainian Football Amateur League.

References

Football
Khmelnytskyi
Khmelnytskyi